Shah Rafiqul Bari Chowdhury is a Jatiya Party (Ershad) politician and the former Member of Parliament of Sherpur-1.

Career
Chowdhury was elected to parliament from Sherpur-1 as a Jatiya Party candidate in 1986 and 1988.

References

Jatiya Party politicians
Living people
3rd Jatiya Sangsad members
4th Jatiya Sangsad members
5th Jatiya Sangsad members
Year of birth missing (living people)